Ali Arman (born 12 December 1983) is a Bangladeshi former cricketer. He played 34 first-class and 24 List A matches between 2001 and 2007. He was also part of Bangladesh's squad for the 2002 Under-19 Cricket World Cup. He is now an umpire, and stood in matches in the 2017–18 Dhaka Premier Division Cricket League.

References

External links
 

1983 births
Living people
Bangladeshi cricketers
Bangladeshi cricket umpires
Chittagong Division cricketers
Cricketers from Dhaka